The SZD-22 Mucha Standard (Szybowcowy Zakład Doświadczalny – Glider Experimental Works) was a single-seat aerobatic glider designed and built in Poland from 1957.

Development 
Developed especially for the 1958 World Gliding Championships, the SZD-22 Mucha Standard was a direct descendant of the IS-2 Mucha (Fly), from 1948, and SZD-12 Mucha 100, from 1953, with very similar lines and dimensions. The Mucha Standard was designed to the new Standard class rules which discarded the old Olympic 15-15-15 Span, Aspect Ratio, Area rule.

The first flight of the SZD-22 took place at Bielsko with Adam Zientek at the controls on 10 February 1958.<ref name=bab>

Further reading
 Taylor, J. H. (ed) (1989) Jane's Encyclopedia of Aviation. Studio Editions: London. p. 29
 Coates, Andrew. "Jane's World Sailplanes & Motor Gliders new edition". London, Jane's. 1980.

External links

 http://www.piotrp.de/SZYBOWCE/pszd22.htm
 http://www.the-blueprints.com/blueprints/modernplanes/modern-su-sz/18740/view/szd_22_mucha_standard/
 http://www.gliding.co.uk/bgainfo/technical/datasheets/muchastandard.pdf
 http://www.airliners.net/photo/Aero-Club--/SZD-22C-Mucha/1555641/L/&sid=3ba58f7669167ff0d9b18bf497a11bf6
 http://www.luftfahrtmuseum.com/htmd/dtf/szd22.htm

SZD-22
1950s Polish sailplanes
Aircraft first flown in 1958